The Meriden Linear Trail is a rail trail that follows the original route of the Meriden, Waterbury & Connecticut River Railroad through the city of Meriden, Connecticut. It follows  of the former roadbed through the Quinnipiac River Gorge, starting at Red Bridge and ending near the Meriden/Cheshire town line. This portion of the Linear Trail system is named The Quinnipiac River Gorge Trail.

History
Construction of the Meriden & Waterbury Railroad (M&W) commenced in 1887 and finished the following year, when the M&W Railroad merged with the Meriden and Cromwell Railroad to form the Meriden, Waterbury & Connecticut River Railroad. The line never saw high traffic, and by 1924 the section from West Main Street in Meriden to East Farms in Waterbury was abandoned.

The line through Meriden remained active until 1966 as an industrial spur to Ragazzino's on West Main Street and the Suzio York Hill Quarry in East Meriden. Since little new development has occurred along the line, much remains intact with the railroad tracks still in place.

Construction began in 2006 and was opened November 2007. Future expansion has been discussed.

References
Meriden Linear Trail official website
Andrew Perlot, "Residents seek answers on master plan". Meriden Record-Journal, June 25, 2008.

 

Rail trails in Connecticut
Protected areas of New Haven County, Connecticut
Meriden, Connecticut